Diaperasticus is a genus of earwigs in the family Forficulidae. There are about six described species in Diaperasticus.

Species
These six species belong to the genus Diaperasticus:
 Diaperasticus bonchampsi (Burr, 1904)
 Diaperasticus erythrocephalus (Olivier, 1791)
 Diaperasticus krausei Steinmann, 1983
 Diaperasticus sansibaricus (Karsch, 1886)
 Diaperasticus sudanicus Steinmann, 1977
 Diaperasticus wittei Hincks, 1955

References

Further reading

 
 

Forficulidae
Dermaptera genera